Grew Manufacturing is a popular name for construction of Grew vessels with early beginning in 1882 as Gidley Boat Works. In 1920, Arthur Grew took over the boat business and renamed the business, which is located in Ontario, Canada. Grew Manufacturing expanded into a modern recreational boat producer of Bowrider and Cuddy cruisers, powered by outboard and inboard motors. Created in fiberglass, Grew's later vessels were built in modern facilities. In 2011, the Grew employed about 25 people.

Early history

On the shores of Georgian Bay in 1882, the Gidley Boat Works began manufacturing wooden boats. Craftsman Arthur Grew from Penetangushine in the late 1920s took over the company and succeeded in expanding it, while enlarging and updating its product line.

Launches
Grew, Cutter and Profisher are brands built in Ontario.
 158 LE Classic
 168 GR/BR
 174 GR/BR
 174 GR/BR
 174 GR/BR
 175 GRS/BR
 184 GRS/BR
 188 GR/SK
 188 SKI/BR
 194 GRS/BR
 204 GRS/BR
 208 GRS/CD
 224 GRS/BR
 244 GRS/CD
 SC  l  BASS BOAT  l  WIDE
 SC  l  BASS BOAT  l  WIDE
 GRS  l  CABIN CRUISER
 GRS  l  CABIN CRUISER
 GRS  l  CABIN CRUISER
 GRS  l  CABIN CRUISER
 GRS  l  CABIN CRUISER
 GR  l  CUDDY CABIN
 GR  l  CUDDY CABIN
 GRX  l  CUDDY CABIN
 GRX  l  CUDDY CABIN

Receivership
The company's finances were seriously affected by the 2008 recession and subsequent exchange rate changes.

During the winter of 2011. Don Vanderstadt, the company's sales manager, was injured from gun fire and other employees fled the boatyard as result of hearing that shots had been fired. The team had returned from the Toronto International Boat Show. Owner and President David Cameron died after an exchange of gunfire with police Feb 11th, 2011, near Kemble. With David's death, the family attempted to sell the business, but were unsuccessful.  The company had liabilities of more than $2 million and about 100 creditors. 1673747 Ontario Inc. operated as Grew Manufacturing, while 2045227 Ontario Ltd. operated, Courage thinks, as Profisher or Profisher Direct.

References

External links
 http://www.grew.ca/

Canadian boat builders
Companies established in 1882
Companies disestablished in 2011
Shipbuilding companies of Canada
1882 establishments in Ontario
2011 disestablishments in Ontario
Canadian companies established in 1882